Fred Allen was an American comedian, mostly known today for his radio show, which is probably the reason Allen is a forgotten comedian. With the coming of television radio shows become a thing of the past. Allen starred in six feature films and a few short films.

Allen was an original host of the Colgate Comedy Hour, but he was taken out of the rotation of hosts after two months.

The last days of his career Allen was a panelist on What's My Line. Fred Allen died on St. Patricks Day of 1956 at age 61.

References

American comedy television series